Rushville is a city in Schuyler County, Illinois, United States. The population was 3,192 at the 2010 census and 2,902 in 2018. It is the county seat of Schuyler County. It was first settled by Euro-Americans in 1823.

History 
In 1823, Calvin Hobart and his family became the region's first settlers. When Schuyler County was first established in 1825, it originally contained portions of the counties of Pike, Fulton, and Brown. Benjamin Rush's hometown of Rushton changed its name to "Rushville" in 1826.

Geography

Demographics

As of the census of 2000, there were 3,212 people, 1,397 households, and 888 families residing in the city. The racial makeup of the city was 99.13% White, 0.06% African American, 0.09% Native American, 0.06% Asian, 0.03% Pacific Islander, 0.22% from other races, and 0.40% from two or more races. Hispanic or Latino of any race were 0.47% of the population.

There were 1,397 households, out of which 25.8% had children under the age of 18 living with them, 50.8% were married couples living together, 10.2% had a female householder with no husband present, and 36.4% were non-families. 33.2% of all households were made up of individuals, and 18.0% had someone living alone who was 65 years of age or older.  The average household size was 2.22 and the average family size was 2.78.

In the city, the population was spread out, with 21.7% under the age of 18, 7.9% from 18 to 24, 24.4% from 25 to 44, 22.2% from 45 to 64, and 23.8% who were 65 years of age or older.  The median age was 42 years. For every 100 females, there were 89.2 males.  For every 100 females age 18 and over, there were 82.6 males.

The median income for a household in the city was $30,450, and the median income for a family was $38,125. Males had a median income of $27,582 versus $20,631 for females. The per capita income for the city was $16,180.  About 7.5% of families and 10.8% of the population were below the poverty line, including 12.2% of those under age 18 and 16.8% of those age 65 or over.

Climate

Point of interest 
Murals were produced from 1934 to 1943 in the United States through the Section of Painting and Sculpture, later called the Section of Fine Arts, of the Treasury Department. In 1938 artist Rainey Bennett painted an oil on canvas mural for the post offices in Rushville titled,  Hart Fellows - Builder of Rushville.

Notable people 

Larry Ball, NFL linebacker for the 1972 Miami Dolphins. (Super Bowl VII Champion) Also played for the Tampa Bay Buccaneers and the Detroit Lions. Graduated from Rushville High School.
 Ralph Luther Criswell, city council member (Los Angeles, California)
 William H. Dieterich, US senator
Russell R. Dohner, Medical Doctor
 Francis M. Drake, 16th Governor of Iowa, born in Rushville
 Wesley Clair Mitchell, economist, born in Rushville
 William H. Ray, a member of the United States House of Representatives from Illinois
 Edward W. Scripps, newspaper publisher and founder of The E. W. Scripps Company, born in Rushville
 Ellen Browning Scripps, philanthropist
 James E. Scripps, publisher
 Pinkney H. Walker, Chief Justice of Illinois Supreme Court, lived in Rushville

References

External links
Rushville Tourism

Cities in Schuyler County, Illinois
Cities in Illinois
County seats in Illinois
1823 establishments in Illinois